Rafael Andres Nieto Rondon, known simply as Andres Nieto, is a Colombian professional footballer who plays as an attacking midfielder for Phnom Penh Crown.

Club career
Nieto has played in four countries, mostly in North America, South America, and The Caribbean. In 2019, he joined Phnom Penh Crown of the Cambodian League, becoming the first ever Colombian to do so.

Honours
Phnom Penh Crown
 Cambodian Premier League: 2021, 2022
 Cambodian Super Cup: 2022
 Cambodian League Cup: 2022

References

External links

Living people
1996 births
Colombian footballers
Footballers from Bogotá
Association football midfielders
Phnom Penh Crown FC players
Colombian expatriate footballers
Colombian expatriate sportspeople in Venezuela
Expatriate footballers in Venezuela
Colombian expatriate sportspeople in the Dominican Republic
Expatriate footballers in the Dominican Republic
Expatriate footballers in Cambodia